The Chayair Sycamore is a South African autogyro, designed and produced by Chayair of Musina.  The aircraft is supplied as a kit for amateur construction or as a complete ready-to-fly-aircraft.

Design and development
The Sycamore features a single main rotor, a two-seats-in-tandem open or optionally enclosed cockpit, tricycle landing gear with wheel pants and a four-cylinder, liquid and air-cooled, four-stroke, dual-ignition turbocharged  Rotax 914F engine in pusher configuration. The  Subaru EJ22 is optional.

The aircraft fuselage is made from bolted-together aluminum tubing and mounts a  diameter Advanced Kinetics rotor. The tailplane features five vertical tail surfaces for improved directional stability.

Operational history
By December 2012 one example had been registered in the United States with the Federal Aviation Administration in the Experimental - Amateur-built category.

Variants
Sycamore Mk 1
Enclosed cockpit version
Sycamore Mk 2000
Open cockpit version

Specifications (Sycamore Mk 1)

References

External links

Official Sycamore Mk 1 photos

2000s South African sport aircraft
Homebuilt aircraft
Single-engined pusher autogyros